Vincent Julien Sasso (born 16 February 1991) is a French professional footballer who plays for Portuguese club Boavista F.C. as a full-back or a central defender.

Club career
Sasso was born in Saint-Cloud, Paris. On 18 June 2008, he signed his first professional contract with FC Nantes. He made his professional debut on 31 July 2010 in a 4–2 penalty shootout away loss against US Boulogne in the first round of the Coupe de la Ligue, and went on to spend two years with the first team in Ligue 2, contributing 20 games to a ninth place in 2011–12.

In the summer of 2012, Sasso joined S.C. Beira-Mar in Portugal for three years. He scored his first goal for the Aveiro club on 6 October, putting the visitors ahead in an eventual 2–1 defeat at S.L. Benfica. His team would eventually suffer relegation, but he had already left in late January 2013 to fellow Primeira Liga side S.C. Braga, on a contract until June 2017.

On 30 June 2015, Sasso was loaned to Sheffield Wednesday from the English Championship in a season-long move. After making only 18 competitive appearances, he left.

In August 2016, Sasso rejoined Wednesday after signing a permanent one-year contract. He returned to Portugal and its top division in the following off-season, agreeing to a two-year deal at C.F. Os Belenenses as a free agent. 

Sasso moved to the Swiss Super League on 17 June 2019, signing with Servette FC for three seasons.

Honours
Braga
Taça da Liga: 2012–13

References

External links

1991 births
Living people
Sportspeople from Saint-Cloud
French footballers
Footballers from Hauts-de-Seine
Association football defenders
Ligue 2 players
FC Nantes players
Primeira Liga players
Liga Portugal 2 players
S.C. Beira-Mar players
S.C. Braga B players
S.C. Braga players
C.F. Os Belenenses players
Belenenses SAD players
Boavista F.C. players
English Football League players
Sheffield Wednesday F.C. players
Swiss Super League players
Servette FC players
France youth international footballers
France under-21 international footballers
French expatriate footballers
Expatriate footballers in Portugal
Expatriate footballers in England
Expatriate footballers in Switzerland
French expatriate sportspeople in Portugal
French expatriate sportspeople in England
French expatriate sportspeople in Switzerland